This is the list of Turkish exonyms for the places in Greece. There is a rich array of Turkish place names throughout Greece as a result of several centuries of Ottoman rule.

Central Greece Orta Yunanistan, Helenya, Helenistan
Achelous River Aksu Irmağı
Aetolia-Acarnania Karlıeli, Karlı İli, Karlıili, Karlı Eli, Etolo-Akarnanya
Aitoliko Anadolkoz, Analtolkoz, Anatolikoz, Anatoluka, Anatoliko, Etoliko, Koçlar, Koçular
Agrafa Ağrafa
Agrinio (Vrachori) İmrahor, Virahor
Amfilochia Kervansaray, Karvasaras
Amfissa Saline, Salna, Salona
Amvrakia Emerke
Angelokastro Engili Kasrı, Engilikasrı, Engelikasrı, Enekli, Angili Kasrı
Antirrio Kastel-i Rumeli, Rumeli Kasteli
Atalanti Talanta, Talanda
Athens Atina, Atine, Medinetü'l-Hukemâ, Medinetü'l Hükema, Medinetül Hükema
Agios Dimitrios İbrahimi
Chaidari Haydari
Elliniko Hasani, Hasan Ağa
Attica Attike, Atik
Chaeronea Esedabad, Esedli, Esedobası
Chalandri Hâlâ
Domokos Dömeke, Dimoko
Evinochori Buhur, Bihor, Kasaba-i Bihor
Evinos River Yılan Nehri
Faliro Faleron
Fyli Haşa
Galatas Galata
Itea Salona İskelesi
Kalyvia Kaliva
Karpenisi Kerbeneş, Krenbeş, Kerpiniş
Kifisia Kifse, Kerpesi, Kefsa
Koumintri Kunduri
Lake Amvrakia Emerke Gölü
Lamia İzdin, Zeytun, Zeytuni, Ezdin, İzzeddin
Lidoriki Olendirek, Olunduruk 
Livadeia Livadya, Levadya
Magnesia Magnesi
Malian Gulf Maliyak Körfezi
Megali Chora Zeban, Zapanti
Megara Meğara
Mendenitsa Modoniç, Mudunuç, Mudoniç, Modonuç, Moduniş
Missolonghi Miselonka, Misolonki, Mesalongi, Meselunka
Mount Hymettus Delidağ, Kuh-i Mecnun
Naupactus İnebahtı, Eynebahtı, Aynabahtı
Oropos Rubus
Perdikaki Sarıkaçan, Karakaçan, Sakarcı
Piraeus Pire, Aslan Liman, Ejder Limanı, Porto Liyo, Porto Leone
Bay of Zea Paşalimanı
Mikrolimano Türklimanı
Paliampela Balım, Balım Bey
Porto Rafti Terzilimanı
Raftis Island Terzi Kayası, Derzi Kayası
Rouga Ruga
Sounion Temaşalık Burnu, Sütun Burnu
Spercheios River Alamana Nehri, Karasu, İsperke
Thebes İstefe, İstife, İstefa, İstifa
Thermopylae Termopil
Xiromero Ekseremere, Eksemere
Valtos Valtoz, Alto
Vonitsa Voniçe, Voniçse
Vouliagmeni Karasu
Ypati Patracık, Bardacık, Badracık
Epirus Güney Epir, Çamerya
Agios Dimitrios Topçular
Agios Minas Aya Mina
Ano Pedina Yukarı İsudena, Epano İsudena
Arta Narda
Athamanika Cumerka Dağları
Delvinaki Delvinaki
Derviziana Dervişhane
Dikorfo Küçük Çodila
Filiates Filat
Igoumenitsa Gomniçe, Gümenice, Gomenice, Gomaniçe, Reşadiye (Between 1909-1913)
Ioannina Yanya
Kato Pedina Aşağı İsudena
Kipoi Baya
Koukouli Kokuli
Konitsa Koniçe, Kuniçe
Louros Loros, Lorus
Margariti Margaliç, Margılıç, Margelliç, Margalıç
Metsovo Maçova, Meçuva, Meçova, Miçova
Monodendri Yukarı Mahalle
Papingo Patiko
Paramythia Aydonat, Aydunat, Paramiti
Parga Parga
Pente Pigadia Beşpınar
Piges Virbiçe, Vresteniçe
Preveza Preveze
Skamneli İskamin
Souli Suli
Syrrako Sira
Syvota Morto, Murto, Sobot
Tsepelovo Çepelova
Vitsa Vezica, Viziça, Veziça, Vitza
Vourmpiani Vurbiyan
Vrysochori Leşiniçe
Zitsa Şişe
Macedonia Ege Makedonyası, Güney Makedonya, Aşağı Vardar
Adam Adamköy
Adendro Kırcılar, Kırcalar
Afitos (formerly Άθυτος) Atitos
Agia Paraskevi Yeniköy
Agio Pnevma Veznik
Agios Antonios (formerly Μικρό Πλαγιάρι) Kücüklü
Agios Athanasios Kavaklı, Kavaklı Çiftlik
Agios Manas (formerly Αη-Μάμας) Aya Mama
Agios Nikolaos (formerly Αη-Νικόλας) Aya Nikola
Agios Prodromos (formerly Ρεσετνίκια) Reşidnik
Agios Vasileios Ayo Vasil, Ayvasil, Ayvasıl
Alexandreia Rumluk, Gidahor
Aliákmon İnce Karasu, Bistrice
Almopia Karacaova, Meglen, Möglen
Anarachi Debre
Angitis River Karasu, Kara Su
Ano Scholari (formerly Μπασισλή) Bahşişli
Antigonos Köseler
Archangelos Oşani
Ardameri (formerly Αρδαμέρ') Edremir
Ardassa Sılpova, Salipova
Argos Orestikon Hurpişte, Horpişte
Aridaia Sıbiska
Arnaia (formerly Λιαρίγκοβη) Raligova, Raligovi
Arnissa Usturova, Üstürve, Osturva, Ostrova
Asvestochori Kireçköy, Kireç
Asvestopetra Hasanköy
Azapiko Azapiko
Chalastra Küleki
Chalkidiki Halkidikya, Halkidiki, Üç Parmak
Chalkidona Yaylacık
Chortiatis Hortaç
Chryso Topolyan, Topolyani
Chrysoupoli Sarışaban, Sarı Şaban
Dafni Dafni İskelesi
Damiano Sülüklü
Dendri Orman Çiftlik, Orman Çiflik
Dexameni (formerly Βάβδος or Μπαϊραμίτσι) Bayramiç
Dikorfo (formerly Παζαρλήδες) Pazarlı
Dispilio Dubyak
Doiran Lake Doyran Gölü, Toyran Gölü
Doirani Doyran, Toyran
Doxato Doksat
Drama Dırama, Drama
Drosero Asar Bey
Drias Meşeli
Edessa Vodina
Efkarpia Lembet, Simbet, Lebet
Ekali Gedikli
Elatochori Uskuterna, Uskutrina, Uskurna
Elaiochori Kuçkar, Koçkar
Elaiochoria (formerly Νταουζλήδες & Ντοπρολήδες) Davutlu / Dobrulu (Dobralı)
Elatia Kara Dere
Eleftheres Leftere, Telfere
Eleftheroupoli Pravişte
Elliniko Mirova
Emmanouil Pappas Dovişte, Dovista, Dobista
Emporio Ömberya
Eptalofos Sevindik
Evosmos Harmanköy, Yeni Kokluca
Evropos Aşıklar
Exaplatanos Kapenyan, Kapinyani, Kapinyari
Fanos Mayadağ
Florina Florina, Filorina, Kaylar
Foustani Fuştan
Galatades Sucuklu
Galatista (formerly Γαλάτ'στα) Galaça
Galatista (formerly Κιουρτζόγλου) Kurcoğlu
Gallikos Salmanlı, Salamanlı
Gazoros Poyra, Porna
 Doğanca
Giannitsa Yenice-i Vardar
Goumenissa Gömençe, Gömence, Gümence
Grevena Girebene, Grebene, Grebne
Haliacmon (river) İnce Karasu
Hilandar Filandar
Ierissos Erse, Yerise
Ipsilon Kasaplı
Irakleia Bayraklı Cuma, Cuma-i Zir, Aşağı Cuma
Irakleotes Krifçe
Kaimakchalan Kaymakçalan
Kalamaria Kelemerye, Kelemeriye, Kalamarya, Gelmeriye
Kalamitsi (formerly Καλαμίτσ') Kalamici
Kalandra Kalandra
Kali Yağcı Köy
Kalindria Kilindir
Kallipoli Kara Hamza
Kallithea Eğri Dere
Kallithea (formerly Μάλτεπε) Maltepe
Karabournaki Karaburun
Kardia (formerly Καρατσουχαλί) Karaçovalı
Karyes Kariye, Karye
Kassandra Kesendire
Kassandreia Kesendire, Valta
Kastaneri Baroviçe
Kastanochori Umur Bey
Kastoria Kesriye, Gölükesri, Gölikesri, Gölükestre, Kesri
Katerini Katerin, Katrin
Kato Scholari (formerly Ανταλήδες) Adalı
Kavala Kavala
Kechrokampos Darıova, Darıovası
Kelli Keli
Kentriko İsnefçe
Keramoti Keremetli, Kiremit, Kiremit Limanı
Kilkis Kilkış, Kılkış
Kitros Çitroz
Kivotos Krifçe
Kladero (formerly Τσιπισλίδες) Cepişli
Kleisoura Kilisura, Gülısıran, Kilisıran, Klisura, Kilisora
Kokartza Kokarca
Kokkinia Kuşova
Kolchida Akçakilise, Akçe Kilise, Alçak Kilise
Konstantia Gustulüp
Koromilia İsliveni
Koroneia Kara Mahalle
Koronouda Alburlu
Kosteno Kösten
Koufalia Kurfallı
Kozani Kozan, Kozana
Krini Kırna
Kristoni Sarıgöl
Kryonero (formerly Καραγιού Σουφλάρ) Kara Yusuflar
Ktenas Tarakçılar
Lake Koronia Ayvasil Gölü, Ayvasıl Gölü
Lake Orestiada Kesriye Gölü, Gölikesri Gölü
Lake Volvi Beşik Gölü
Langadas Langaza
Lankoma (formerly Ατματζιαλήδες) Atmacalı
Lefkona Kavaklı
Lekani Mincinos, Muncunos
Leptokarya Leftehor
Litochoro Litohor
Livera Kurucaova
Loudias (river) Karaazmak, Kara Azmak
Loutrochori Banya
Marathousa (formerly Ραβνά) Ravna
Megali Panagia Ravenik, Revenik
Melissochori Balca
Melissi Balca
Melissourgio Mezdürek
Meliti Türbeli 
Mesimeri (formerly Μεσ'μέρ') Meşmer
Mesovouno Kırımşa, Kırımşah
Metagitsi (formerly Μεταγκίτσ') Metangiç
Metamorfosi (formerly Βόζινα) Vozina
Mikralona (formerly Πόζαλαν) Bocalan
Mikrokampos Alihocalar, Gölobası
Mikros Vavdos Akpınar
Milea Kırlat
Monovrysi Salih Ağa
Mount Athos Aynaroz, Ayanoroz, Ayneroz
Mount Falakro Bozdağ
Mount Voras Kaymakçalan Dağı
Monokklisia Karacaköy Bala, Karacaköy Zir
Myrkinos Toksanboz
Naousa Ağustos
Nea Charavgi Cuma, Cumapazarı, Cumabazarı, Cumaabat
Nea Apollonia Eğribucak
Nea Filadelfeia Nareş
Nea Gonia Çingeneli, Çiganeli
Nea Malgara Kokmuş
Nea Moudania Kargı Limanı
Nea Peramos Kale Çiflik, Eski Kavala, Telfere Liman
Nea Poteidaia Portes
Nea Skioni Çaprani, Keramidi
Nea Zichni Zihne, Zihna
Neapoli Nasliç, Naseliç, Nasliğ
Neo Souli Şubaşıköy, Subaşköy
Neochori Yeniköy
Neoi Epivates Bahçe Çiflik
Nigrita Negrita
Nikiforos Nusretli
Neos Skopos Keşişlik, Tumba Keşişlik
Notia Nutya, Nanti, Nanta
Nymfaio Neveska
Oraiokastro Davut Bâli, Dutbal
Orfani Örfihane, Orfan
Orino Ören Dere
Palaio Gynaikokastro Avrathisar, Avrethisar, Avrethisarı
Palaio Mylotopos Sarı Kadı
Palaiochori, Chalkidiki Palyohor
Palaiochori, Grevena Büyük Pelahor, Palihor
Pangaion Hills Pınar Dağ
Panorama Arsaklı, Aksaklı
Paranesti Bük
Pella Alakilise, Postol
Pentapoli Sarmısaklı, Sarımsaklı, Sarmusaklı, Sarmasakçı
Perdikkas Nalbantköy
Petrades Sarıdoğan
Petralona Tilkili
Pierian Mountains Şapka Dağları
Pikrolimni (lake) Acı Göl
Pikrolimni (village) Gülobası
Plagiari Uzun Ali
Platamon Palatmina, Palatimne, Olacak, Bilatimene, Pilatmene
Plevroma Yeni Köy
Polichni Karahüseyin
Polygyros Poliroz, Polyoroz
Polykarpi Liçista
Pontochorio Eskice, Veti Pazar
Pontokerasia Paprat
Póroi Poroy
Prosotsani Pürsıçan, Persican, Bersican, Prüsçan
Proti Küpköy
Ptolemaida Kayılar, Kayalar, Kılar
Pylaia Kapıcılar
Serres Serez, Siroz, Siruz, Sirez
Servia Serfice, Serfiğe, Serfiçe
Siatista Seçişte, Sateste, Şatista, Setüstü, Armutköy
Sideras Demirciler, Demirhanlı, Temirhanlı
Siderokausia Sidre Kapısı, Sidrekapı, Sidrekapısı, Sidrekapsi, Sidrekabsi
Sidirokastro Timurhisar, Demirhisar
Simantra Gargara
Sindos Tekeli, Tekeliova
Sitagroi Minare Çiftlik, Minare Çiflik
Sithonia Longoz, Sitonya, Lonkoz, Longos
Skotoussa Brusanik
Skra Lübniçe
Skydra Vertekop
Stagira Kazancı Mahalle
Stavroupoli Lembet, Lemin, Melit, Zeytinlik
Stefanina İstifaniye
Stivos Gümeniç, Gülmeniç
Stratonicea İzvor
Struma (river) Karasu
Terpyllos Kürküt
Theodosia Hacıbayram
Thermi (formerly Σέδες) Sedes
Thessaloniki Selanik
Agiou Dimitriou Street Mithat Paşa Caddesi
Apostolou Pavlou Street Islahane Caddesi
Archeologikou Mousiou Street Hacı Hayri Paşa Caddesi
Egnatia Street Vardar Caddesi, Tahtakale Caddesi
Eleftherias Square Hürriyet Meydanı, Olimpos Meydanı
Eleftheriou Venizelou Street Sabri Paşa Caddesi
Ethnikis Amynis Hamidiye Caddesi
Hamidie Fountain (Spring of Kalamaria) Hamidiye Çeşmesi, Kelemerye Çeşmesi
Heptapyrgion Yedi Kule
Konak (Thessaloniki) Konak, Hükümet Konağı
Ladadika Yağcılar Mahallesi
Nikis Boulevard Kordonboyu
Praxitelous Street Sezai Paşa Caddesi
Toumba Tumba, Tepeüstü
Tsimiski Street Paralelli
Upper Town Yukarı Mahalle
White Tower Kanlı Kule, Beyaz Kule
Zeitenlik Zeytinlik
Toumba Tumba, Tunya
Tragilos Çerkezköy
Tripotamos Çömlekçi
Valtochori Sarıca
Valtotopi Beylik Mahalle
Vathylakos Vadilik
Velventos Çarşamba
Veria Karaferye, Karaferya
Vermio Mountains Karataş Dağları
Vogatsiko Boğazköy
Xino Nero Ekşisu
Zarkadia Gedikli
Zimnicea Zimniçe
Zygos Zigoş
Peloponnese Mora, Peloponez
Achaea Ahaya
Acrocorinth Kale, Gördüs Kalesi, Gördes Kalesi
Aetopholia Sabakalfa
Agios Nikolaos Seliniçe
Agios Petros Ayapetri
Agoriani Agoryan
Agrilia Aydın
Aigio Voştiçe, Vostiça, Vostiçse, Vostica
Akovos Akova
Amaliada Dervişçelebi, Derviş Çelebi
Ampelokampos Karagöz
Anavryto Gardiki
Andritsaina Ardamiça
Androusa Andrusa
Areopoli Çimova, Cibova
Argos Argoz, Arhoz, Arhos
Aristomenis Mustafapaşa, Mustafa Paşa
Asopos Asopoz
Atsicholos Açiholos
Avia Zarnata, Zarnato, Saranta
Avlonas Karamustafa, Kara Mustafa
Cape Maleas Benefşe Burnu, Malya Burnu
Cape Skyli İskilli Burnu
Chalandritsa Kalandriçe, Kalandriça
Chlemoutsi Holomuç, Hulumiç, Holumuç, Holumiç, Kulumiç, Holomiç, Helomiç
Corinth Gördes, Gördüs, Gördös, Korint, Korent, Kordos, Koritos
Derveni Derbent
Diminio Diminoz
Doloi Doloz
Drakoneri İsmail
Epidaurus Epidor
Exochori Ardovişta
Fanari, Andritsaina Kal'a-i Fener, Fanar, Fener, Fanus-i Mora
Gaitsa Gaçiça, Gaçica
Mantineia Mandina
Gastouni Gaston, Gastun, Guston, Gastuni
Gialova Yalova
Glarentza Larinçe, Kal'a-i Larinçe
Goranoi Goranoz
Gulf of Corinth Korint Körfezi
Ierakas Yarakari
Iria İri
Isaris Hisar
Kalamata Kalamata, Kalamatya
Kalavryta Kalavrata, Kalavrita
Kalogria Gölbaşı, Kalugarya, Kalogriye, Kallurga
Kalentzi Kalenci
Kardamyli Mila İskelesi, Mila Limanı
Kareas Kaliya, Kalya, Kalb
Karytaina Kartina, Karitina, Karitena
Kastania Kastaniya
Kelefa Kelafa
Kentro İmam Çavuş
Kokkinia Kokinapoli
Koroni Koron, Karon
Koutifaris Kutufari
Koutsi Kuçiya
Kyparissia (Arkadía) Arkadya, Arkadiya, Erkadya, Zemin-i Manya
Lagkada Lankada
Lefkochori Müslümbey
Leontari Londar, Londari, Leondar
Longa Lonka
Longanikos Lonkanik
Mani Peninsula Manya Burnu
Mantineia Mandina
Megalopolis Sinano
Melitini Zelina
Messini Meş Senya, Messenya, Mesinni, Nisi, Nişiköy sahrası
Methoni Modon, Mudon, Moton, Motun, Medun
Milea Mila
Monemvasia Benefşe, Menekşe, Benefçe, Malvasya, Menavasye, Meneveşiye, Meneveşiyye, Marvazi
Moni Zerbitsa Zerbiçse Manastırı
Mystras Mizistre, Mezistre, Mezistire, Mizistire, Misistire, Misistra, Misehor
Myrsini Süleymanağa
Nafplio Anabolu, Anabolı, Anapoli, Yenişehr-i Mora, Mora Anabolusu, Mora Yenişehir
Bourtzi Castle Burç, Kastel-i dar-ı hayat
Nea Figaleia Zursa, Zurça
Nomitsi Nomçin, Nomiçin
Oitylo Vitiloz
Ortholithi Orsolis
Palaiochori Selim Çavuş
Passavas Pasova
Patras Ballıbadra, Balyabadra, Ballıbadira, Badra, Balya Badre, Balye Badre, Balya Badra, Ballı Badra
Petritsi Arnavutali, Arnavut Ali
Pigadia, Argolis Peyada
Pigadia, Messinia Pigadya, Piyadya, Yiga, Biga, Bigatya, Bingatya, Nibgatya
Platsa Pilaça, Pılaça
Pontikokastro Pondikoz
Porto Kagio Kaya Paşa Limanı
Porto Kagio Castle Güllü Kalesi, Kelli Kalesi, Kapuspata
Pylos Navarin, Anavarin
New Navarino fortress Anavarin-i cedid, Yeni Navarin, Yeni Anavarin
Old Navarino castle Anavarin-i atik, Eski Navarin Kalesi, Eski Anavarin Kalesi
Pyrgos Pirgos, Burgaz-ı Cedid, Pazgan
Rio Mora Kasteli, Mora Kalesi
Rovia Ruya
Santomeri Sandomir, Santomer
Sminos (Vardounia) Bardunya
Stenosia İlyas Ağa, İlyasağa, Elyas Ağa, Elyasağa
Thalero Fileroz
Thanas Tana
Thermisia Termiş, Termih
Trikolonoi İstemniça, İstimniça
Triodos Aliçelebi, Ali Çelebi
Tripoli Tripoliçe, Tripoliça, Trabliçe, Triboliçe, Tırbolu, Tirebolu, Tarapoliçse, Taraboliçse
Vachos Voha
Vardounia Bardunya
Vasiliki (Kourtsouna) Kurçuvuna
Vatheia Vatiye, Vatyaza
Vocha Voha
Voies Vatika
Vouprasia Ali Çelebi
Vrina Firina
Thessaly Tesalya, Teselya
Achilleio, Farsala Kakleci, Kakletzi
Aetolofos Büyükköy, Desen
Achilleio, Larissa Borazan
Agia Yenice, Ayan, Akya, Ayya
Agia Sofia Okçular
Agios Vissarion, Pyli Cumapazarı, Cumabazarı, Çaputlu
Almyros Ermiye, Urumye, Urmiye, Irmiye
Ampelakia Embelek
Ampelonas Kazaklar, Kavaklar
Argyropouli Karagöl
Aspropotamos Aspropotam
Domeniko Döminek
Elassona Alasonya, Alasunya
Elateia Küçük Keserli
Evangelismos Hacıobası, Bazarlıobası, Pazarlıobası
Fanari Fenarbekir, Fener, Fenar, Fener-abadan
Farkadona Çiğ Ot
Farsala Çatalca
Gonnoi Dereli
Kalabaka Kale Pek, Kalabaka, Kalabakdağı, Kalabakkaya
Kalochori Toybaşı, Orta
Karditsa Kardiça, Kardiçe, Kardiçse, Karadiğe, Gardiçe
Kileler Kileler, Göller
Kypselochori Balcı
Larissa Yenişehir, Yenişehr-i Fenar, Yenişehir-i Fenar, Yenişehir i-Fenari
Makrinitsa Makreniçe, Makrinice
Malakasi Malakas
Mikrolithos Satıobası
Mount Olympus Alemboz Dağı, Semavatevi
Ossa Asarlık
Parapotamos Bahçeler
Mount Pelion Pilavtepe
Pineios River Köstem Irmağı
Portaria Portarya
Rodia Musalar
Sarantaporo Sarantaporon
Stefanovikeio Hacımisi
Stomio Çayağzı, Papazköprüsü
Sykourio Büyük Keserli
Tempi Bababoğazı
Trikala Tırhala, Tırhale, Turhala
Tsaritsani Kiliseli, Kenisalu, Çariçan
Tyrnavos Turnova, Tırnova
Velestino Velestin
Volos Koç, Kuluz, Golos, Koloz, Golo, Galoş, Galos
Western Thrace Batı Trakya, Garb-i Trakya
Evros Meriç ili
Aisymi Doğanhisar
Alexandroupoli Dedeağaç
Amfitriti Çekirdekli
Ammovouno Simavna
Amorio Karabeyli, Karaveli, Karayenli
Ampelakia Kulaklı
Antheia Şahinler, Şahinli
Ardas river Arda nehri
Arzos Kulaklı Çiftliği
Avas Derbent, Dervent
Bara Gölcük
Chandras Erçeli, Kabahöyük
Cheimonion Umurbey
Chelidona Helvacı
Didymoteicho Dimetoka, Dimoduka, Demotika
Dikaia Kadıköy
Dikella Dikilitaş
Dilofon Üreyiş, Yüreyiş, Yürüyüşköy
Drepanon Burgucan Çiftliği
Dymi Osmanlı Çiftliği, Uskanlı Çiftliği
Elaia Deleleşköy, Deliilyasköy, Divaneilyas
Ellinochori Bulgarköy, Balı Bulgarköy
Erythropotamos river Kızıldelisu
Evros river Meriç nehri
Feres Farecik, Ferecik, Firecik
Ferygion Efrem, Efremköy
Ftelia Karaağaç Çerman, Karaağaç Çermen, Karaağaç Çirmen
Fylakion İnceğiz, Seymenli, Simenli
Galia Yaylacık
Galini Çengelli, Cingirli
Kanadas Epçeli
Kastanies Çörekköy, Kestanelik
Kavyli Eymirli, Eymürler, Eymürlü, Emirler, Emirli
Keramos Kermut, Körmüt, Kör Ümid, Kiremitli
Kissari Hisar Beyli, Hisarcık
Kliso Kilisalık, Kiliseli
Komara Kumarlı, Musaköy
Kornofolea Karapınar
Krios Kadı, Kartonlu, Koyunlu
Kyani Çavuşlu
Kyprinos Sarıhisar, Sarıhıdır
Lavara Saltık, Saltıkköy
Lepti Camişerif, Eceköy
Loutros Ulucabeyköy, Ilıca
Lykofos Vakf-ı Sandal, Vakıf, Ukuf
Lyra Yelkenci
Makri Mekri, Megri, Makri
Mandra Mandıra
Marasia (formerly Loggos) Maraş
Mega Dereio Büyük Derbent
Megali Doxipara Büyük Çavuşlu, Doğanca, Doğancı Çiftliği
Mesimvria Güvendik
Mikra Doxipara Küçük Çavuşlu, Türkdoğanca, Türkdoğancı
Mikro Dereio Küçük Derbent, Malak Dervent
Milia Bektaş, Bektaşiköy, Bektaşlı, Söğütlü
Nea Vyssa (formerly Achyrochori or Pachni) Ahırköy, Yenibosna
Neo Cheimonio Yeni Omurlu, Yeni Umurbey, Yeni Umurbeyli
Neochorion Tatar Yeniköy
Oinon İğneoğlu, İneoğlu
Orestiada Kumçiftliği
Ormenio Çirmen, Çemen, Çerman, Çermen
Palaistra Pehlivan Çayırı
Pali Bıldırköy
Patagi Pazarlı
Pentalofos Beştepe
Pyrgos Elburgaz, Yelburgaz
Perama Görece, Gürece, Güreci
Petrota Karabağ, Taşlık
Plati Sadırlı, Sarıhıdır, Sarıhisar
Protokklisi Başkilise
Provatonas Koyunyeri, Koyuneri
Pythio Kuleliburgaz, Eğri Kaleli Burgaz
Rizia Dulcaaras, Tufanca-i Ardı
Sagini Şahince, Şahinci
Sakkos İshaklı, Karaishaklı Çiftliği
Soufli Sofulu
Spilaion İspitli
Sterna Salpistatar, Tatar Ali, Tatarköy
Therapeio Sarıyer
Thoyrion Urlu
Tychero Bıdıklı
Thymaria Köpekli
Thyrea Kapıcı, Kapucu, Kapuçu, Kapuçi
Valtos Saltıklı, Saltıklı Çiftliği, Saltuklu
Vyas Bökköy
Zoni Çavuşköy
Rhodope Rodop ili
Aigeiros Kavaklı
Amaxades Arabacıköy
Arriana Kozlukebir
Fillyra Sirkeli
Fylakio Seymenli, İnceğiz
Gratini İricanhisar, Ircanhisar, İğrican, Ağricanhisar
Iasmos Yassıköy
Kechros Mehrikoz
Komotini Gümülcine
Maroneia Maronya, Marile
Organi Hemetli
Sapes Şapçı, Şapçılar, Şabcılar, Şaphane
Sosti Susurköy
Xanthi İskeçe ili
Abdera Bulustra
Ano Karyofyto Yukarı Kozluca
Ano Livera Yukarı Ada
Askyra Karaoğlan
Avato Beyköy
Dafno Mahmutli
Echinos Şahin
Eranos Otmanören
Erasmio Taraşmanlı
Evlalo İnhanlı
Exochi Üşekdere
Galani Çakırlı
Genisea Yenice-i Karasu, Yenice-i Karacasu
Glafki Gökçe Pınar
Imera Saltuklu
Ioniko Hüseyinköy
Kato Karyofyto Aşağı Kozluca
Kato Livera Aşağı Ada
Kentavros Ketenlik
Kimmeria Koyunköy
Komnina Kurlar
Kotyli Kozluca, Kazanova
Lake Vistonida Borugöl
Livaditis Hamidiye
Lykodromio Kurtalan
Mangana Büyükosmanlı, Büyük Osmanlı
Melivoia Elmalı
Myki Mustafçova
Nestos (river) Mesta Karasu
Oraio Yassıören
Paschalia Bayramlı
Petrochori Kayalar
Satres Sinikova
Selero Gökçeler
Sidīrópetra Demirtaş
Sminthi Dolaphan
Stavrochorion Hocalar
Stavroupoli Yeniköy
Thalassia Denizli
Thermes Ilıca
Topeiros İnhanlı Belediyesi
Toxotes Okçular
Xanthi İskeçe, Eskice, İsketye, İskete
Aegean Islands
Crete Girit, Kirid, Girid, İkrit
Agios Vasileios Ayvasil, Ayvasıl, Eyuvasil, Ayo Vasil
Agioi Theodoroi (islands) Aya Todori Adaları, Kal'a-i Todoriler, Todori, Todoriler
Agios Mironas Aya Miron, Ayamiron
Agios Nikolaos Aya Nikola, Ayanikola, Ay Nikola, Mendirek, Yalos
Amari Amarya, Amari, Amariye
Amnatos Amnato
Anatoli Anadolu
Anogeia Anoya
Apodoulou Apodolu
Apokoronas Apokoron, Apkoron, Apokorono
Argyroupoli Arkiropoli
Atsipopoulo Açipopolo
Chania Hanya
Chromonastiri Hro Manastırı
Chryse Kalderon, Eşek, Altınada
Dionissiades Yeniçeri Adaları
Fournoi Furni
Garazo Garazo
Gavdopoula Gavdopula, Kösen
Gavdos Gavda, Gavdi, Gados, Gozo, Koza 
Gazi Gazi
Gramvousa Kırambosa, Granbosa, Garabusa, Grabusa
Heraklion Kandiye
Houmeri Humeyri
Ierapetra Yerapetre, Yerepetre, Yalıpetra, Karapusa
Kandanos Kandanos
Kasteli Kastel
Kato Chorio Koturyo, Kötüryo
Kavousi Kavusi
Kissamos Kisamu, Kisamo, Kissamu
Kritsa Kariça
Kydonia Kidonya
Lasithi Laşit
Lazaretta Islet Nazarta
Lefka Ori Ak Dağlar
Malevizi Maloiz
Margarites Margaritis
Melidoni Melidoni
Meronas Marona
Mournies Murnes
Mylopotamos Milopotamu, Milopotamo, Milapotmo, Sivrihisar
Neapoli Yenişehir
Pediada Pediye
Pigi Piyi
Rethymno Resmo
Roustika Rustika
Samaria Samarya
Selino Selene, Selne, Selina
Sfakia İsfakya, Esfakya, İsfakiye, İsfakye
Sitia Estiye, İstiye, Sidye, Sitya
Souda Suda
Spinalonga İsperlonga, Spinalonya, İsperlanka
Stylos Eşkiloz
Temenos Temnos
Tourloti Turluti
Tzermiado Cerniyodu
Vrachasi Vrahaş, Vraha
Zenia Esine
Cyclades Kiklat Adaları, Tavşan Adaları
Amorgos Yamurgi, Mırgır, Yumurgi, Mırgar, Yamorgi, Mamurgoz
Nikouria Likurya, Nikurya
Anafi Anafiye, Mafiye, Anafiya
Andros Andıra, Andire, Andira, Andre
Gavrio Karga Limanı
Anydros Anidro
Antikeros Yassıca, Antikeri
Antimilos Küçük Değirmenlik
Antiparos Andibara, Andobade, Andobare, Andibare
Delos Delos, Dilos
Didimi Didim
Donoussa Hacılar, İstanos, Tenuse
Dragonesion Yılan
Folegandros Bolukendire, Poli Kendire, Polikandiro, Polikandiros
Gyaros Papazlık, Şeytanlık, Şeytan
Hristiana Hıristiyanlar Menzili, Hıristiyan
Htapodia Mykonou Doğancık, İstaporya
Ios Aniye, Ünye, Enye, Niyoz, Niyo, İne, Anya, Anye, Ayna
Iraklia Örenli, Rakliya, Odunluca, Yassıca
Kalogiros Venedik Kayası, Kalari, Kalageri
Kardiotissa Kardivinis, Kardiyonisi, Lağusa
Kea Mürted, Murtad
Keros Karo
Kimolos Gümüş
Koufonissia Yassıca, Kufonisya
Kythnos Termiye, Terme, Termine, Termid
Makronissos Bibercik, Birecük, Biricik, Uzunca, Cezire-i Biper, Cezire-i Biber
Milos Değirmenlik, Dermenlik
Mykonos Mökene, Mükene, Mukene, Mokine, Mokana, Mekine, Miknoz, Mikonos
Naxos Nakşa, Nakşe
Macheres Açaryez, Acariez
Pachia & Makra Pakya & Makra
Paros Bara, Para, Bare, Bere, Berre, Baro
Naousa Kala-i Agusta
Polyaigos Polino
Rhineia Sığırcıklar
Santorini Santoron, Santoronlar, Senturin, Mesenturî, Santurin, Şantörün, Santorin, Santorini
Aspronisi Beyaz Ada
Nea Kameni Büyük Yanık Ada
Palea Kameni Küçük Yanık Ada
Schoinoussa Eskino
Serifopoula Serfo
Serifos Koyunluca, Serkoz, Serfoz, Sermina, Koyunlıca
Sifnos Yavuzca, Yavuzcular, İspinos, Şefenoz, Şefnos, Sinfinos, Şifnoz
Sikinos Eskinos, Eşkinos, İşkinos, İskinos, Siknos
Syros Sire, Sira, Siroz, Şira, Şıra, Şire
Thirasia Serbarlı, Tiraçya
Tinos İstendil, İstendin, İstandil, İstandiye, Tine, Dene
Dodekanisos Onikiada, Cezair-i İsna Aşer, Menteşe Adaları, Güney Sporatlar, Güney Asporatlar, Karya Adaları
Adelfoi Syrnas Islets Kızkardaşlar, İkikardaşlar
Agathonissi Eşek, Gaydaros
Alimnia Limoniye, Limoniya, Hırmanlu, Alimya, Aliminya, Alimiye, Limonsa, Limye, İlimya
Antitilos Askino, Askina
Arkoi Nergiscik, Mandraki
Armathia Ermeniya, Akça
Astakida İstakida, Astakida, Cuyad
Astypalaia İstanbulya, İstanbuliye, İstampulya, İstanbulye, İstambulya, İstampolya, İstanbolya, İstinpalya, İstanbuliyye, Ostropalya, Ustropalya, Astropalya
Chamili Kamilun
Dragonera Dragonera
Farmakonisi Bulamaç, Burmaç
Fidoussa Yaban, Tifoza
Gaidourosnissi Tilou Eşek, Gadaros
Gyali Sakarcılar, Yalı, Sakarcalar
Halki Herke, Harke, Helke, Harki, Herkit, Herekyet, Heleke, Harake, Hereke, Karki
Hondro Hondro
Kalolimnos Kalolimni, Kalolimnoz
Kalymnos Kilimli, Kelemez, Gelemez, Kalyamoz, Kalimnoz, Kalimnos
Kandeloussa Çerte, Kandilli, İstambulya Papazlığı
Kaparonisi Kapari
Karpathos Kerpe, Çirbe, Gerpe, Karpat, İskarpento
Aperi Apri
Arkasa Arkasa
Menetes Menatise, Menatişe
Mesochori Misuhoriye
Koraki Korasi
Olympos İylinboz
Pyles Pliz
Kasos Kaşot, Çoban, Çobanlu, Çobanlar, Hububat, Kaşat
Kastellorizo Meis, Kızılhisar, Harmansız, Mis, Misi, Mesir, Kastelûrizen, Mes, Meyis
Kinaros Ardıçcık, Zenari
Kos İstanköy
Antimachia Andimahya, Andımahya, Şehitler, Adimahi, Andimahi, Andmahı, Andmahiye
Asfendou Asfendiyu, İspenye
Aspa Aspa
Kako Prinari Kabapınar
Kamari Kamari
Kardamena Kardamena, Anasarna
Kefalos Kefaloz, Keyfeloz
Konario Konyalı
Kos İstanköy, Kal’a-i Narence, Nefs-i Narence, Narince, Narence, Narenç
Kumburno Kumburnu
Lagoudi Lagudi
Lampi Göl
Mastichari Mastihari, Sakızlı
Marmari Marmari
Paradisi Kara İncir
Plaka Soğanlı
Platani Germe, Kerme, Gereme
Psalidi Makas Burnu, Kisteli, Kilseli
Pyli Pili, Kapıcılar
Tigaki Tingaki, Tuzla
Zipari Zibari, Cıbar
Kounoupoi Konoba, Konopa
Koutsomytis Kocamedi, Koçomiti
Leipsoi İlipsi, Lipsi, Lipos, Eşekler, Himaran
Leros İleriye, İleryoz, Leryoz, Liryoz
Levitha Koçbaba, Kocapapaz, Koçpapaz, Koca Papas, Koçpapas
Liadi Megalo & Liadi Mikro Kendiroz Kayalıkları
Megalo Sofrano Safran
Nimos Miskin, Nimöz
Nisyros İncirli
Patmos Batnaz, Batnoz, Batnos Baba, Patnoz, Abatnos Papas
Pontikoussa Pondikonis, Kondikosa
Pserimos Keçi, Kapari
Rho Karaada
Rhodes Rodos, Lodos, Rados, Lodoz, Rados, Rodoş
Afandou Afandoz, Afondoz
Archangelos Honholoz
Cape Vodi (Cape Bovo) Öküz Burnu
Filerimos, Rhodes Sünbüllü, Sümbüllü
Kallithea Kalatiz, Klikse, Klikes
Kattavia Katavya, Kataviya
Koskinou Köşkenoz, Keşkenoz
Kritinia Kastelloz, Kastelli, Kostelloz
Lindos Lendos, Lindoz, Londoz, Lindos
Paradeisi Uluova, Villanova, Yılanlıova, Yılanabâd, Vilanova, Cem Bahçesi
Pastida Bastiya, Bastiye, Basdiye
Psightos İpsitoz
Maritsa Mercan Tepe
Rhodes (city) Eski Rodos
Hippocrates Square Şadırvan Meydanı
Platia Enidriou Kumburnu
Sokratus Street, Rhodes Uzunçarşı
Salakos Salakoz, Salaköz, Salakos, Salahoz
Sgourou Özkur, Uzgur
Saria Doğancık, Küçük Kerpe, Misarya, Saros, Sariye, Togancık
Seirina Ardacık, Sirena, Sirina
Sesklio Seskili, Haklı
Stroggyli Çamada, Fener adası, İpsili
Symi Sömbeki, Sümbeki, Zömbeki, Sönbeki, Zümbeki, Zönbeki, Simi
Cape Kutsumpa Kirpici Burnu
Tilos İlyaki, İlkil, İleki, İlleki, İllik, İlliki, İliki, İlki, Eliki, Elbaki, Aleki, Piskopiye, Papazlık, Papaslık
Tria Nesia Üçadalar
Eastern Sporades Saruhan Adaları, Doğu Sporatlar, Doğu Asporatlar
Antipsara Küçük İpsara, Antipsara
Chios Sakız
Kalamoti Kalemati, Kalamoti, Kiremitli, Kalamoto
Kardamyla Kardamlı, Kardemile, Kardamila, Kardamile
Lagkada Langada
Limenas Paşa Limanı
Mastichochoria Sakız Köyleri
Mesta Mesta
Pyrgi Pirgi, Birgi
Volissos Voliso, Viliso
Fournoi Fornoz, Aksan, Fornozlar, Furnaz, Fornos
Icaria Ahikerya, Ahikerye, Ahikerda, Ahigeri, Ahikerpe, Karyot, İkarya, İkaryot, Nikarya
Agios Kirykos Aya Krikos
Evdilos Odilos
Lesbos Midilli, Midillü
Agiassos Ayasu
Agios Georgios Agras Hızır İlyas Adası
Agra Ağra, Ağriye
Anemotia Anamotya, Anamutya
Arisvi Cumalı
Cape Agrelios Zeytinburnu
Cape Korakas Göreke Burnu
Chidira Hidre
Dafia Vafyo, Dafiya
Gera Yera, Yere, Bere
Eressos Herse
Filia Filye, Falya, Filya
Ippeio İpyoz, İbod
Kalloni Kalonya, Kolonya, Kalniye, Kaline
Kalo Limani Çamur Limanı
Kapi Kapya, Kapye
Káto Trítos Katartöz, Katırtöz
Kerameia Keramya, Kelemiye, Kelemye
Kleio Göle, Güle
Komi Komi, Kumi
Lisvori Lizgor
Loutra Lutra
Loutropoli Thermis Sarıılıca, Güzel Sarıılıca, Sarlıca, Sarlıca Kaplıcası, Sarı Ilıca, Sarliçe
Mantamados Mande, Manda, Manide, Mandamanda, Mandemande, Mandemados, Mandomanda
Mesagros Mesagüre, Mesagros
Mesotopos Mesatopi, Misetopu
Mistegna Müstefna, Mestegna
Molyvos Molova, Molva, Moluva, Molove, Molivos, Moliva, Mulva
Mount Lepetymnos Karakaş Dağı
Mytilene Midilli
Nees Kydonies Balçık, Yeni Ayvalık
Pamfyllo Baltaoğlu Adası
Parakoila Parakila, Peraşle
Pelopi Kale
Perama Permar, Perame, Pereme, Bire, Pre, Perme, Preme
Petra Petre, Petra
Pigi Pigi
Plagia Karasinan
Plomari Pilmar, Pilimar, Pilimer
Polichnitos Polihnit, Polhinit, Polihnet, Polihinit
Pterounta Afteronda, Ufturunda
Sigri Sığrı, Sağrı, Suğra, Sığır Limanı
Skalochori Çömlekköy, Çömlek
Skopelos Uskuplo, Uskublo
Stypsi İstipse
Sykounta Oşkondo
Sykaminia İskamya, Eskamya, İskamye, İskimye, Eskemya
Vasilika Feslige, Vasleçot
Vrachonisida Kalloni Karbiye Adası
Ypsilometopo İşlemetopu, İslemetobi
Oinousses Koyun Adaları, Papaz Adaları, İnossa
Pasas Paşa, Taşçiftliği, Başa
Pontikonissi Gavati, Pondiko
Vatos Vaton, Vati, Vatos
Psara İpsara, Pasra, İbsara, İpsala
Samos Sisam, Susam
Ano Vathy Vati
Chora Hora
Karlovasi Karlovası, Karlıova, Karanlıkova, Karlova
Kastania Kastango
Kokkari Kokar
Koumaíïka Komiska
Koumaradaioi Komaradesi
Leka Laka
Marathokampos Ereza Ovası, Rezene Ovası, Merato-Kambo, Moratokampo
Mavratzaioi Meveracesi
Mytilinioi Midilnoz
Myloi Değirmen, Kılıç Ali Paşa, Mibli
Pagondas Pagonda
Palaiokastro Eski Kal'a
Pyrgos Pirgos
Pythagoreio Tigani
Skouraíika İskureyka
Vathy Ahırlı Limanı
Thymaina Hurşid, Hurşit, Hurşidler, Fimena, Dimina
Tomaronisia Çıplak Adalar
Tokmakia Tokmak Adaları
Barbalias Barbalya, Büyük Tokmak
Panaghia Panagya, Küçük Tokmak
Aspronisia Manide Adaları
Aspronisos Kesenderlik
Tsoukalas Akça
Euboea Eğriboz, Ağrıboz, İğriboz, Öbe
Argyronisos Pirbaba
Chalcis Halkis, Negreponte, Halkida, Kara Baba
Karystos Kızılhisar, Kastello Rosso
Mandilou Mendil
Manolia & Strongili Eşek Adaları
Oreoi Oderbos
Petalioi Karaadalar, Dimalı, Bali, İpetali
Pontikonisi Sıçancık
Styra Örenli
Ionian Islands Yediadalar, İyon Adaları, Yanya Adaları, Cezayir-i Seb'a-i Müctemi'a
Antikythera Sıkliye, Küçük Çuha, Küçük Çuka, Küçük Çuko
Antipaxos Küçük Bahşi, Anti Pakşo, Küçük Bakşu
Arkoudi Arkudi
Atokos Atokos
Corfu Korfu, Korfuz, Körfez, Korfoz, Korfa, Kefere, Korfoş, Körfüz, Körföz
Korission Lagoon Korusa Gölü
Liapades Liyapadis
Ýpsos İpsokorfo
Elafonissos Paşa, Geyik
Ereikoussa Merlera
Ithaki İtake, İtaki, Küçük Kefalonya
Kalamos Kalamos
Kastos Kastos
Kefalonia Kefalonya, Kefaloniye
Kythira Çuha, Çuka, Çukalar, Çuko
Lefkada Aya Mavra, Lefke, Ayamavra, Ayamovra, Lefkode, Aymavra, Lefkede
Mathraki Matraki
Meganisi Meganisi
Othonoi Fanus
Paxi Bahşi, Paksu, Pakso, Pakşo, Bakşu, Bahşılar
Proti Burad, Pradna
Sapientza Burak, Burak Reis, Burakreis, Berak, Berrak, Barak, Spençe, Sipanca, Barak Reis
Strofades Mallu Kilise, Çanlu Kilise
Zakynthos Zante, Zaklise, Zakilda, Zenta, İzakilise, İzakilse, Zaklisa, Zanta, Zakesna
North Aegean Islands Boğazönü Adaları, Kuzey Ege Adaları, Trakya Adaları
Ammouliani Tavuk
Agios Eustratios Bozbaba, İstirati
Kafkanas Güllüce
Lemnos Limni, Ilımlı, İlimli, İlimni, Limnoz, Limoz, Tin-i Mahtum
Agios Dimitrios Lera
Atsiki Açık, Açiki
Cape Mourtzephlos Ulufeci Burnu
Cape Plaka Pılaka Burnu, Palaka Burnu
Ekato Kefalon Yüzbaş Limanı, Yozbaş Limanı
Gomati Gomatos
Gulf Pournias Hüdai Körfezi
Kalliopi Kalyop
Kaminia Kamine, Kamina
Kaspakas Kaspaka
Kastrin Burun Hisar
Katalakko Katalakoz
Kontias Kandiya, Paşalimanı, Kondiye, Kondoya
Kontopouli Kondüpol Limanı, Kondopul, Kondopol, Kandopol, Ontopol
Kornos Korinoz
Kotsinos Çökenez, Göcenez, Liman-ı Çökenez
Livadochori Livadhor
Lychna Lihne, Linhana
Moudros Mondros, Mondroz, Mondoroz, Mondoros, Mudros
Myrina Kastro, Mirina, Marina, Palıkasri, Palukasrı, Palokasri, Balı Kesiri, Balıkesiri, Palyo Kastro, Palokastro
Palioportaria Palyaportarya
Panagia Çiftlik, Kilisecik
Pedino Pesper Ağa
Plaka Pılaka, Palaka
Platy Platos Limanı, Pilati, Pilaya
Repanidi Rupanid
Sardes Zirvados
Tsimandria Samandra, Semandra
Varos Varoş
Mersinia Mersinya, Mersin
Samothraki Semadirek, Semendirek, İslamdirek, İslamterek, Semendire, Somadrek
Cape Makrivrachos Kadırga Burnu
Paliapoli Palyebolu, Palyeboli
Sergitsi Köpek, Kelp
Thasos Taşoz, Taşuz, Taşyüz, Taşözü, Taşöz, Taşoz-i Osmaniye
Kallirachi Kakiraçi, Kakiraç, Kagırı, Kakiri, Kakeraki
Kalyvia Hamidiye
Kastro Yenihisar
Limenaria Hamidiye İskelesi
Maries Maryaz
Megalos Prinos & Mikros Prinos Kazavit, Kasavit
Limenas Thasou Liman, Limanköy, Limanhisar, Liman Hisar
Panagia Panaiya, Panagya
Potamia Potamya, Potomya
Rachoni Bulgar
Skala Prinou Kazavit Limanı
Skala Rachoniou Bulgar İskelesi
Sotiras Sotiros
Theologos Tolos
Thimonia Demir-Halka
Thasopoula Ayı, Küçük Taşoz
Zourafa Zürafa Kayası
Northern Sporades Tesalya Adaları, Şeytan Adaları, Kuzey Sporatlar, Kuzey Asporatlar
Adelfoi Islets Kardaşlar, Defliye
Alonissos Kırlangıç, Halodermiye, Sakbos, Çamlıca
Gioura İblislik, İblisler, Şeytanlık, Çura
Kyra Panagia Keçi, Pelagos, Kirepanabaya
Peristera Güğercin, Hasır, Bozada
Piperi Biber, Hırsız
Psathoura Arsura
Sarakino Sarakin, Sarakenon
Skantzoura İskandil, İskancura, Nergiscik
Skiathos İskados, İskedos, İskitos, İşkados, İşketos, İşkatoz
Skopelos İskapolos, İşkapolos, İskepelos, İşkepelos, İşkepeloz, İskabolos, Üsküpelos
Skyros İskiri, İskeri, İşkiros, Eskerüs, Eskiros, Üsküros, Üskuros, İşkebroz
Tsougria Sığrı
Saronic Islands & Argo-Saronic Islands Saron (Pire Körfezi) Adaları ve Argolis (Anabolu Körfezi) Adaları
Aegina Ayena, Ayana, Egine, Ekene, Eyne, Eğine, İğne, Egina, Eğin, Ekin, Ekine, Egene
Agios Georgios Kedelen Papazlığı, Kerke, Görge, Karkacık, Yoros, Ayayorgi, Gerge, Körke, Albora, Karki, Sancorci
Agistri Engiste, Engeteri
Dokos Tokuz, Dokoz, Küçük Çamlıca, Dokas
Falkonera Felakonda, Esken, Polkanera
Fleves Küçük İstakoz Adası, Papudya
Hydra Çamlıca, Çamlıcalar
Patroklos Karaada, Nergisçik, Eşek Adası, Büyük İstakoz Adası, Gaydaranisi
Plateia Argolidas Somun
Poros Domala, Pura, Boros, Poroz
Psili Argolidas İpsiri
Romvi Tulumada, Tulum, Tolom, Tolo
Salamis Külür, Kelür, Kulur, Kolori, Salamis, Salamina, Salamine
Skilli İskilli
Spetses Suluca, Sulucalar, İspeçe, Sulıca
Spetsopoula Nasınca, Küçük Suluca
Velopoula Kargı, Kargi, Rapila

Place names of Turkish origin in Greece